Kaylie Jones (born 5 August 1960 in Paris, France) is an American writer, memoirist and novelist.

Biography 
Jones is the daughter of National Book Award-winning novelist James Jones (From Here to Eternity), and Gloria Jones, a former actress and stand-in for Marilyn Monroe. Kaylie Jones grew up in Paris, France, and Sagaponack, New York. She is a graduate of Wesleyan University and Columbia University School of the Arts.

She has taught in the public schools of New York City through Teachers & Writers Collaborative, and has organized a symposium at Southampton College in memory of her father, who died in 1977.

In 1998, Jones' book A Soldier's Daughter Never Cries (published in 1990) became a Merchant Ivory film. The film was directed by James Ivory and starred Leelee Sobieski as Channe (the protagonist in the novel).

Lies My Mother Never Told Me (2009), a memoir, describes her life  as the child of a celebrated author and a beautiful, competitive and witty mother, who became an editor at Doubleday with her friend, Jacqueline Kennedy Onassis. Kaylie Jones's relationship with her mother became more combative after her father's death in 1977.

In 2011, Jones was instrumental in publishing an uncensored edition of her father's From Here to Eternity. Her essay, "Judite", appears in the anthology Knitting Yarns: Writers on Knitting (2013), published by W. W. Norton & Company.

Personal life 
Jones is married to Kevin Heisler and has a daughter, Eyrna, born in 1997.

Works 
 As Soon as It Rains (Doubleday, 1986) 
 Quite the Other Way (Doubleday, 1989) 
 A Soldier's Daughter Never Cries (Bantam Books, 1990)
 Celeste Ascending (HarperCollins, 2000)
 Speak Now (Akashic, 2003)
 Lies My Mother Never Told Me (HarperCollins/William Morrow, 2009)

References

External links 
 
 Jones bio at Harper Collins
 Holden, J. Z. "The Beautiful Creator - Kaylie Jones," Hamptons.com (July 20, 2006)
 Lybarger, Dan. "Keeping up with the Joneses: An Interview with Kaylie Jones," Pitch Weekly (Jan. 14-20, 1999). Archived at TipJar.com.

20th-century American novelists
21st-century American novelists
Columbia University School of the Arts alumni
Long Island University alumni
Wesleyan University alumni
1960 births
Living people
Writers from Paris
People from Sagaponack, New York
American women novelists
20th-century American women writers
21st-century American women writers